Lilly Bentwitch (born 14 November 1983) is an Australian team handball player. She plays for the club Harbourside Handball, and on the Australian national team. She represented Australia at the 2013 World Women's Handball Championship in Serbia.

References

Australian female handball players
1983 births
Living people